Marie-Chantal Toupin (born July 14, 1971) is a Quebec singer. She has released a number of albums of pop and soft rock music. Toupin has sold over 300,000 albums in Canada and has had two albums certified platinum.

Early life
Toupin was born in Montreal, Quebec, growing up in the city's Rosemont neighbourhood.

Career
Toupin released her first album, Apres Tout, in 1997, and followed this soon after with a self-titled album.

Toupin released Maudit bordel in 2003, and toured in Quebec to support the album, which was a 2004 Juno Award nominee for Francophone Album of the Year.  In 2004, she sang at the Foire Brayonne music festival in Edmundston, New Brunswick.

Toupin's 2005 album Non-Negociable was certified platinum; a second edition was released in 2007.

Toupin left her manager Eduardo Da Costa, and after working independently and then with the Musicor label, returned to him in 2008; the result was an album of soft rock, À distance, in 2009. That same year she released an album of Christmas music, and in 2010 her sixth album, Premier baiser. Her album À ma manière : onze grands succès, released in 2012, was a collection of songs which had won Quebec's Félix Award.

In 2015, Toupin was criticized in the media for making racist comments on her Facebook page; this led the producers of the Pixcom home renovation television show "Flip de filles" to remove her as co-host.

In 2021 she was a competitor in the Quebec edition of Big Brother Célébrités, but voluntarily withdrew after getting drunk and making comments against other competitors which were widely perceived as racist and homophobic.

Discography
 1997 - Après tout
 2000 - Marie-Chantal Toupin
 2003 - Maudit Bordel (Platinum for sales of 100,000+ units)
 2005 - Non-Négociable (Platinum for sales of 100,000+ units)
 2008 - À Distance
 2009 - Noël C'est L'amour
 2010 - Premier Baiser
 2012 - À ma manière Onze grands succès
 2016 - Merci... Mes grands succès

Live album
 2006 - Non négociable : La tournée

References

External links
 Official homepage (in French)

1971 births
Canadian women pop singers
French Quebecers
Living people
Singers from Montreal
21st-century Canadian women singers
French-language singers of Canada
Big Brother Canada contestants